James Patrick McGovern (born November 20, 1959) is a member of the United States House of Representatives, representing  since 1997. A member of the Democratic Party, he is the ranking member of the House Rules Committee, chaired the Congressional-Executive Commission on China, and was the ranking member of the Tom Lantos Human Rights Commission. His district, numbered as the 3rd district from 1997 to 2013, stretches from Worcester to the Pioneer Valley.

Born and raised in Worcester, McGovern attended Worcester Academy. While in college he worked as a congressional intern and then aide to U.S. Senator George McGovern (to whom he is not related), a two-time presidential candidate for whom he campaigned. From 1981 to 1996 he was a senior staff member for U.S. Representative Joe Moakley. McGovern first ran for Congress in 1994, losing the Democratic primary. He ran again in 1996, defeating Republican incumbent Peter Blute. He has been reelected every two years since without serious difficulty.

As chairman of the board of the Congressional Hunger Center, McGovern is known as a leading voice on ending hunger and food insecurity both in the United States and globally. He was a key architect of the McGovern-Dole International Food for Education and Child Nutrition Program. For his work he has earned a 2016 James Beard Leadership Award from the James Beard Foundation and a 2008 McGovern-Dole Leadership Award from the World Food Program USA.

Another focus of McGovern's career has been international human rights, which he has advocated for in countries such as El Salvador, Sudan, Colombia, and the region of Tibet. He is a member of the Congressional Progressive Caucus and has been ranked as one of Congress's most liberal members.

Early life, education, and career
James Patrick McGovern was born in Worcester, Massachusetts, on November 20, 1959. He grew up in Worcester, where his mother, Mindy, was a dance instructor and his father, Walter, owned a liquor store. In junior high school, he first became involved in politics by campaigning for Democratic U.S. Senator George McGovern (to whom he is not related) in his unsuccessful 1972 presidential bid. After graduating from Worcester Academy, he moved to Washington, D.C., where from 1977 to 1980 he worked as an aide to George McGovern. 
 
Jim McGovern attended American University, where he received a Bachelor of Arts in history in 1981 and a Master of Public Administration in 1984. He also served as director of the Kennedy Political Union, American University's student-run speakers bureau. George McGovern ran for president again in 1984, and Jim McGovern was the state coordinator of his Massachusetts campaign branch, and made his nominating speech at the 1984 Democratic National Convention.

In 1981, Jim McGovern joined the Capitol Hill staff of U.S. Representative Joe Moakley. In 1990, Moakley appointed him to lead a House task force investigating the 1989 murder of six Jesuit priests and two women in El Salvador by the Atlácatl Battalion, working with Salvadoran activist Leonel Gómez Vides. He later advocated cutting off U.S. funding for the U.S. Army School of the Americas, where several of the military members had been trained.

U.S. House of Representatives

Elections 
McGovern first ran for Congress in 1994, entering a crowded Democratic primary to represent the area then defined as Massachusetts's 3rd district. The district, in central and southeastern Massachusetts, included parts of Bristol, Middlesex, Norfolk, and Worcester counties–essentially, the heart of the MetroWest region. During the campaign, McGovern said his record as "a Washington insider" would make him a more effective representative. Despite endorsements from Moakley, George McGovern, and presidential aide George Stephanopoulos, McGovern lost the primary to Massachusetts State Representative Kevin O'Sullivan, who then lost to Republican incumbent Peter Blute.

McGovern left Moakley's office in 1996 and moved back to Worcester, again running for Congress. This time, he won the nomination unopposed and faced Blute in the general election. His campaign slogan focused on unseating House Speaker Newt Gingrich: "To dump Newt you have to dump Blute." Blute was endorsed by The Boston Globe and five other local papers, but McGovern won the election with 53% of the vote. He has never faced another contest nearly that close, and has been reelected 13 times. He ran unopposed in 2000 and 2002.

In 2004, he was opposed by Republican Ronald A. Crews, an evangelical pastor, former Georgia state legislator, and president of the Massachusetts Family Institute. A national conservative activist, Crews challenged McGovern's positions on same-sex marriage and abortion. McGovern derided his opponent's focus on social issues, saying, "When Ron Crews gets up in the morning, the first thing he thinks about is gay marriage. I don't think that is the most important issue for most families. Jobs, health care, education, how to make the world a more peaceful place, those are the issues people care about." McGovern defeated Crews with 71% of the vote, and ran unopposed in 2006 and 2008.

In the 2010 election, McGovern faced Republican Marty Lamb, a real estate lawyer, and independent Patrick J. Barron, a Department of Mental Health administrator. He was reelected with 57% of the vote.

He ran unopposed in 2012, 2014, and 2016.

Tenure 
McGovern took over the top Democratic position on the House Rules Committee when Louise Slaughter died. After the 2018 midterm elections in which Democrats won the House majority, McGovern became chair.

Called the "Speaker's Committee" because it is the mechanism that the Speaker of the House uses to maintain order and control of the House Floor, the Rules Committee is often considered the most powerful committee in Congress. As chair, McGovern can influence the introduction and consideration of almost every piece of legislation that comes to a vote.

One of McGovern's first actions as chair was to pass a sweeping set of reforms to the House Rules. He wrote at the time that his changes were designed to "usher in a new era of clean government". McGovern also said the rules changes were "the result of unprecedented bipartisan outreach" and that he had met with "both Democrats and Republicans to seek their input on potential changes".

The National Journal reported that McGovern had used his Capitol Hill experience to help position himself as "a power broker in the Democratic caucus". In 2001, McGovern's mentor, Joe Moakley, at the time dying of cancer, asked Dick Gephardt to help McGovern attain a seat on the Rules Committee. He was given a commitment for the next available Democratic seat.

On the Rules Committee, McGovern has been able to use his experience with House procedures to his advantage. With Republicans comprising the majority of the panel, he "showed a sharp partisan edge as he embraced parliamentary maneuvers that led to cries of outrage" from Republican members.

Impeachment of Donald Trump 
As chair, McGovern played a central role in devising procedures the House adopted for the first impeachment of Donald Trump. At the time, McGovern wrote in The Boston Globe that "[t]he House will ensure the public-facing phase of this inquiry is transparent and will stand the test of time." He later explained his decision to vote for impeachment by saying, "I often think about kids today getting involved in the political process just like I did back in 1972. What will they think if we say that the president’s actions don’t matter?" He supported impeaching Trump again for inciting the January 6, 2021, U.S. Capitol attack.

Visit to Ukraine 
On April 30, 2022, McGovern accompanied House Speaker Nancy Pelosi and three other U.S. representatives on a secret trip to Kyiv, Ukraine, and met with President Volodymyr Zelensky. The delegation pledged billions of dollars in military aid.

Domestic policy

Transportation
For his first three terms, McGovern served on the House Transportation Committee. He and Representative John Olver, who served on the House Appropriations Committee, coordinated to bring extensive transportation funding to their districts. When criticized for his heavy use of earmarks, McGovern responded, "It's not pork. It's nourishment."

Fiscal policy
McGovern supported economic stimulus efforts during the late-2000s recession, including the Economic Stimulus Act in February 2008 and the Emergency Economic Stabilization Act (which established the Troubled Asset Relief Program) in October 2008. He supported the Obama administration's 2009 stimulus package. Responding to Republican criticism of Democratic budgetary priorities, he chided the GOP for running up the national debt under George W. Bush, saying: "It is somewhat ironic that the very people who drove this economy into a ditch are now complaining about the size of the tow truck." He voted to instate the Statutory Pay-As-You-Go Act in February 2010.

Education
The Higher Education Act of 1998 included an amendment by McGovern that doubled Pell Grant funding for two years for students who graduate in the top 10 percent of their class.

Nutrition

As co-chair of the House Hunger Caucus, McGovern is an advocate for expanding child nutrition programs both domestically and internationally. In 2007, he obtained $840 million in required funding for the McGovern-Dole International Food for Education and Child Nutrition Program in the House version of the farm bill. The House–Senate conference committee stripped most of the funding from the final bill.

As the co-chair of the Congressional Hunger Center, McGovern has pushed for changes to foreign aid and hunger relief programs. He proposed establishing a "hunger czar position" to take on food issues. McGovern also took part in the food stamp challenge, which entailed living on the average $21 in food stamps for a week.

Immigration
McGovern has voted against major efforts to restrict illegal immigration, including the REAL ID Act of 2005, the Border Protection, Anti-terrorism, and Illegal Immigration Control Act of 2005, and the Secure Fence Act of 2006.

Health care
McGovern believes health care is a human right. He voted for the Health Care and Education Reconciliation Act of 2010, ultimately pushing for a robust public option that was not included in the final measure. He supports Medicare for All.

Voting age
In January 2023, McGovern was one of 13 cosponsors of an amendment to the Constitution of the United States extending the right to vote to citizens 16 years of age or older.

Corporate personhood
In 2010, McGovern said he thought the Supreme Court decision Citizens United was wrongly decided, and that the First Amendment does not protect unlimited political advertising by corporations. He elaborated, saying that corporations should not "have the same equality as a regular voter". At first, he said that "the Constitution was wrong", but later said he had misspoken. On November 15, 2011, McGovern introduced the People's Rights Amendment, a proposal to limit the Constitution's protections to only natural persons, not corporations. In January 2012, McGovern promoted his participation in a panel discussion titled "Corporations are not people." On July 14, 2014, McGovern and Representative Ted Deutch introduced H.J. Res 119, which includes a section to address corporate personhood.

Social issues
McGovern has a pro-choice record on abortion. He voted against the Partial-Birth Abortion Ban Act in 2003 and the Unborn Victims of Violence Act in 2004. He supports stem cell research, voting for the Stem Cell Research Enhancement Act in 2005, 2007, and 2009. He voted for the Employment Non-Discrimination Act of 2007, which would have prevented employment discrimination on the basis of sexual orientation. He voted against the Federal Marriage Amendment, which would have constitutionally outlawed same-sex marriage, in 2004 and 2006, and co-sponsored the Respect for Marriage Act of 2009, which would allow the federal government to recognize same-sex marriages.

Objection to 2016 presidential election results
On January 6, 2017, McGovern objected to Alabama's electoral votes, which Donald Trump had won with 62.08% of the vote. Because no senator joined his objection, the objection was dismissed.

Foreign policy and human rights

China 
On July 21, 2019, McGovern called attacks against Hong Kong's anti-extradition bill protesters "orchestrated violence against peaceful protesters" and urged Hong Kong authorities to protect the freedom of demonstration.

On 27 October 2022, McGovern and Senator Jeff Merkley urged U.S. financial executives to cancel their attendance at the Global Financial Leaders' Investment Summit, saying, "Their presence only serves to legitimize the swift dismantling of Hong Kong's autonomy, free press, and the rule of law by Hong Kong authorities acting along with the Chinese Communist Party."

Iraq 
McGovern has vocally opposed the Iraq War since its inception. He voted against the initial authorization of military force against Iraq in October 2002. In May 2007, McGovern introduced , to "provide for the redeployment of United States Armed Forces and defense contractors from Iraq". The bill failed by a vote of 255 to 171.

Afghanistan 
McGovern initially supported the War in Afghanistan, but became increasingly skeptical of it. In June 2010, he pushed a funding amendment to require President Barack Obama to make a draw-down plan before any further funding would be authorized. "Let us not waste, you know, more resources, more lives, on a policy that quite frankly is going to lead us nowhere", McGovern said. "We need to let Afghan President Hamid Karzai know that we're not a cheap date. We expect him to clean up his government."

Sudan 
McGovern has been a prominent voice against the Islamist governments of Sudan for its prosecution of the war in Darfur. He has been arrested three times, twice during protests outside the Sudanese Embassy in Washington D.C. On April 28, 2006, he was one of five members of Congress arrested while protesting atrocities in Darfur, along with Sheila Jackson Lee, Jim Moran, John Olver, and Tom Lantos. McGovern was arrested again at the Sudanese embassy on April 27, 2009, this time accompanied by Representatives John Lewis, Donna Edwards, Lynn Woolsey, and Keith Ellison. He was arrested again on March 16, 2012, alongside George Clooney, during a protest outside the Sudanese embassy against the Bashir regime in Sudan.

In April 2007, he called for the U.S. and other countries to boycott the 2008 Olympic Games in Beijing to protest the Chinese government's support of the Sudanese government and, by extension, the genocide in Darfur.

Colombia 
McGovern has traveled several times to Colombia to meet with human rights advocates, and has been very critical of Plan Colombia and US military aid to that country. On March 25, 2008, The Wall Street Journal published an unsigned editorial suggesting that McGovern supported the Marxist FARC rebels in Colombia. According to the Journal, an investigation of the computer hard drive of the recently killed Raúl Reyes, second-in-command of the FARC, had turned up material indicating "an ardent effort" by McGovern "to do business directly with the FARC." The article said that McGovern had been "working with an American go-between, who has been offering the rebels help in undermining Colombia's elected and popular government." In response, McGovern said that his concern was to help win the release of hostages held by the FARC, as requested by several of their families. He said he had no sympathy for the rebels.

The situation has gathered international attention, including defense of Nobel Laureate attorney Shirin Ebadi after she received threats warning her against making speeches abroad, and defending Iran's minority Baháʼí community.

Cuba 
McGovern advocates normalizing diplomatic relations with Cuba. He accompanied President Barack Obama to Cuba in 2016. He said at the time that "Americans have long been ready for a 21st-century approach to Cuba and with our two nations working together, we can create new opportunities for American businesses, increase travel and exchange, and support efforts in Cuba to advance democratic reforms and promote human rights.”  He also joined Secretary of State John Kerry on a 2019 trip to reopen the U.S. embassy in Havana.

In 2000, McGovern met with the Cuban grandmothers of five-year-old Elian Gonzalez. Elian's mother had drowned while trying to escape from Cuba with the boy. Although Elian reached Florida safely, McGovern advocated for his return to his father's custody in Cuba.

In 2002 McGovern joined the Congressional Cuba Working Group, which advocated for lowering restrictions on travel and food shipment to Cuba. He is the current co-chair of the Tom Lantos Human Rights Commission (formerly the "Human Rights Caucus"). His work on human rights issues earned him the Washington Office on Latin America's "Human Rights Award" in 2007.

Myanmar 
On November 18, 2013, McGovern introduced House Resolution 418. The resolution calls on the government of Myanmar to end the persecution and discrimination of the Rohingya people within its borders and calls on the U.S. government and the international community to pressure the Burmese to do so. The resolution was in response to allegations of Burmese Buddhist attacks on Rohingya Muslims earlier in 2014. McGovern argued that "the Burmese government needs to recognize the Rohingya as an ethnic group. The situation is dire and rapidly deteriorating."

Syria 
In 2023, McGovern was among 56 Democrats to vote in favor of H.Con.Res. 21, which directed President Joe Biden to remove U.S. troops from Syria within 180 days.

Other work 
On April 25, 2018, 57 House members, including McGovern, released a condemnation of Holocaust distortion in Ukraine and Poland. They criticized Poland's new Holocaust law and Ukraine's 2015 memory laws glorifying Ukrainian Insurgent Army (UPA) and its leaders, such as Roman Shukhevych.

Committee assignments 

 Committee on Rules
 Committee on Agriculture
 Subcommittee on Nutrition, Oversight, and Department Operations

Caucus memberships 
House Baltic Caucus 
Congressional Arts Caucus 
Afterschool Caucuses 
Congressional NextGen 9-1-1 Caucus 
Veterinary Medicine Caucus
Congressional Progressive Caucus
Medicare for All Caucus

Political positions

McGovern has aligned himself with liberal and progressive causes. "It's no secret that I'm a liberal", he said in 2010. "I didn't poll any of this stuff, but I am who I am." Political interest groups generally rank McGovern as one of the most liberal members of Congress. The National Journal ranked him among the seven most liberal representatives. The Washington Post noted numerous similarities between McGovern and his mentor, 1972 Democratic presidential nominee George McGovern: "Both are considered among the most liberal and anti-war lawmakers of their generation. The most prominent difference? They aren't related."

From 1997 to 2007, the liberal advocacy group Americans for Democratic Action gave him an average vote rating of 98.5%, whereas its conservative counterpart, the American Conservative Union, gave him an average vote rating of 2.5%. The United States Chamber of Commerce, which advocates for business-oriented policies, gave McGovern a 33% lifetime rating as of 2011.

Family and personal life

McGovern lives in Worcester with his wife, Lisa Murray McGovern, a former aide to U.S. Representative Gerry Studds. They have two children. He has two sisters, who are teachers in the Worcester public school system.

In November 2010, McGovern underwent surgery to remove his thyroid gland after being diagnosed with papillary thyroid cancer, from which he has recovered.

McGovern is Roman Catholic and says that his legislative initiatives such as increased spending on global nutrition and raising taxes on higher income earners originate from the Catholic Church's efforts to serve the poor. He has also said that he draws inspiration from Jesuit values, and in particular from his work as a congressional staffer to investigate the 1989 murders of Jesuits in El Salvador. McGovern told America magazine in 2019, "I realized that if you commit yourself to a certain set of values, a life of service, if you are committed to lifting up the poor and standing with the poor, there's something about that that can be very satisfying. It makes you feel like you're living a life that's worthwhile."

Electoral history

Sources:

References

General biographies

Footnotes

Further reading

External links

 Congressman Jim McGovern official U.S. House website
 Jim McGovern for Congress
 
 

|-

|-

|-

|-

|-

|-

1959 births
20th-century Roman Catholics
21st-century American politicians
21st-century Roman Catholics
American Roman Catholics
American University School of Public Affairs alumni
Catholics from Massachusetts
Democratic Party members of the United States House of Representatives from Massachusetts
Liberalism in the United States
Living people
Politicians from Worcester, Massachusetts
Progressivism in the United States
United States congressional aides
Worcester Academy alumni